Guangshui is a city located in northeastern Hubei province, People's Republic of China, near the border with Henan province. Administratively, it is a county-level city of Suizhou City. Guangshui was known as Yingshan County before December 1988.

Kuixing Tower

A Tranquil Night
A bed, I see a silver light,
I wonder if it's frost aground.
Looking up, I find the moon bright;
Bowing, in homesickness I'm drowned.

Traditionally, parents whose children are attending college entrance examinations go there to pray and burn incense.

Administrative divisions

Four subdistricts:
Yingshan Subdistrict, Shili Subdistrict, Guangshui Subdistrict, Chengjiao Subdistrict

Thirteen towns:
Wushengguan, Yangzhai, Chenxiang, Changling, Maping, Guanmiao, Yudian, Wudian, Haodian, Caihe, Lidian, Taiping, Luodian

Other areas:
Zhonghuashan Forestry Area, Santan Scenic Area, Province-level Economic Development Area

Historical divisions of Guangshui:

Subdistricts:
Yingshan Subdistrict, Shili Subdistrict, Guangshui Subdistrict

Towns:
Wushengguan, Yangzhai, Chenxiang, Changling, Maping, Guanmiao, Yudian, Wudian, Haodian, Caihe

Township:
Chengjiao Township, Lidian Township, Taiping Township, Luodian Township

Climate

References

Cities in Hubei
Suizhou